Muhammad Akram bin Mahinan (born 19 January 1993) is a Malaysian professional footballer who plays for Kuala Lumpur City as a defensive midfielder. Also known as the passer in the national squad as he is always seeking for passes.

Club career

Johor Darul Ta'zim
In 2013, Akram left Harimau Muda B and signed with Johor Darul Ta'zim. At Johor Akram were given jersey number 31 and he managed to make 18 appearances in his season debut. Akram has been demoted to Johor Darul Ta'zim II for 2014 and 2015 season. He has been promoted to Johor Darul Ta'zim in 2016 but has not made any league appearances, Akram somehow made 2 appearances in 2016 AFC Cup.

Kedah
On 1 December 2016, Akram signed a one-year contract with Malaysia Super League side Kedah. Akram made his league debut for Kedah in 1–1 draw away match on 20 January 2017. His debut goal for Kedah came in from 2–4 win over Melaka United on 11 July 2017, he scored 1 goal in that match that was held in Hang Jebat Stadium, Melaka.

International career
Akram was part of the Malaysia U-19 squad that participated in 2011 AFF U-19 Youth Championship. He scored 3 goals along that tournament.

On 26 March 2015, Akram made his debut for the senior national team in a 6–0 defeat to Oman.

Career statistics

Club

International

Honours

Club
Kuala Lumpur City
 Malaysia Cup: 2021
 AFC Cup runner-up: 2022

Johor Darul Ta'zim
 AFC Cup: 2015
 Malaysia Super League: 2015
 Malaysia FA Cup: 2016

Kedah Darul Aman
 Malaysia FA Cup: 2017
 Malaysia Charity Shield: 2017
 Malaysia Cup runner-up: 2017

Malaysia
 AFF Championship runner-up: 2018

References

External links
 
 

1993 births
Living people
Malaysian footballers
Malaysia international footballers
Malaysia Super League players
Johor Darul Ta'zim F.C. players
Kedah Darul Aman F.C. players
Kuala Lumpur City F.C. players
People from Kedah
Malaysian people of Malay descent
Association football midfielders